Toots is a nickname of:

 Toots Barger (1913—1998), American duckpin bowler
 Salvador Camarata (1913–2005), American composer, arranger, trumpeter and record producer
 Toots Ferrell (1929–2002), American Negro league pitcher
 Toots Hibbert (1945–2020), Jamaican ska and reggae musician, founder of Toots and the Maytals
 Albert Holway (1902–1968), Canadian National Hockey League player
 Denis Kelleher (1931–2002), Irish former Gaelic footballer
 Irving Meretsky (1912–2006), Canadian basketball player, on the 1936 Olympic silver medal team
 Toots Mondello (1911–1992), American swing jazz alto saxophonist
 Toots Mondt (1894–1976), American wrestling promoter
 Susan Ople (born 1962), Filipino politician
 Tommy Sampson (baseball) (1912–2002), American Negro league baseball player
 Toots Shor (1903–1977), American restaurateur
 Toots Shultz (1888–1959), American Major League Baseball pitcher
 Toots Thielemans (1922–2016), Belgian jazz musician
 Les Tietje (1910–1996), American Major League Baseball pitcher
 Toots Zynsky (born 1951), American glass artist

Lists of people by nickname

fr:Toots